The New Left (NL-NS) was a list which contexted the 1978 Trentino-Alto Adige/Südtirol regional election. The list was led by Alexander Langer, a former member of Lotta Continua. NL-NS opposed the dominant ethnic division in South Tyrolean politics. NL-NS won 12,315 votes (4.38%) in Trentino and 9,753 votes (3.65%) in South Tyrol. In total, NL-NS obtained 4.03% of the votes cast in the election. The list won two seats, one from Trento (Alessandro Canestrini) and one from South Tyrol (Alexander Langer).

In the 1983 Trentino-Alto Adige/Südtirol regional election, Langer contested on the Alternative List for another South Tyrol.

References

Defunct political parties in South Tyrol
Political parties in Trentino
Green political parties in Italy
Radical parties in Italy